Coupvray is a commune in the Seine-et-Marne department in the Île-de-France region in north-central France.

People
Coupvray was the birthplace and home of Louis Braille. Braille's home is now a museum. Braille's hands are buried in Coupvray as a symbol of Louis’ system of touch reading, the rest of his body is buried in the Panthéon, Paris.

Points of interest
The Castle of Rohan, built over the period 1596–1602 by Hercule de Rohan, Duke of Montbazon, is another visitor attraction, although it is now mostly in ruins. Disneyland Resort Paris is also nearby.

Demographics
Inhabitants of Coupvray are known as Cupressiens in French.

Education
The commune has the Groupe scolaire Francis et Odette Teisseyre, a school group including one preschool and one elementary school. The collège (junior high school) Etablissement Louis Braille in Esbly serves Coupvray, and the assigned senior high school is the Lycée Pierre de Coubertin in Meaux.

See also
Communes of the Seine-et-Marne department

References

External links

Official Web site of the village of Coupvray 
1999 Land Use, from IAURIF (Institute for Urban Planning and Development of the Paris-Île-de-France région) 
 

Communes of Seine-et-Marne
Val d'Europe